Bernat Joan i Marí (born 22 February 1960 in Ibiza, Balearic Islands, Spain)
was a
Member of the European Parliament with the Esquerra Republicana de Catalunya,
part of the European Free Alliance and sat on
the European Parliament's Committee on Culture and Education.

He was a substitute for the Committee on Development, a vice-chair of the Delegation to the ACP-EU Joint Parliamentary Assembly and a substitute for the Delegation for relations with the Maghreb countries and the Arab Maghreb Union (including Libya).

Education
 Graduate in Catalan Philology
 Doctor in Catalan Philology

Career
 1993-1996: Vice-president of the ERC National Council
 President of the ERC in the Balearic Islands
 Professor of Catalan Language and Literature
 Lecturer in the field of retraining at the Institute of Educational Science, University of the Balearic Islands
 Lecturer at the Universitat Catalana d'Estiu (Catalan Summer University)
 Member of the Social Council for the Catalan Language (Balearic Islands)
 Researcher in the field of sociolinguistics
 Author of essays including Normalitat lingüística i llibertat nacional (Linguistic normalcy and national liberty), Integració nacional i evolució electoral (National integration and electoral evolution), and Una altra Europa és possible (Another Europe is possible), as well as novels and theatrical works.

Trivia
In December 2006, he contributed to the Flemish Secession hoax, by giving an interview in which he congratulated Flemings for their purported independence.

He is a supporter of the Campaign for the Establishment of a United Nations Parliamentary Assembly, an organisation which campaigns for democratic reform in the United Nations.

References

External links
 
 
 Bernat Joan i Marí on The Association of Catalan Language Writers, AELC.

1960 births
Living people
Republican Left of Catalonia MEPs
People from Ibiza
Academic staff of the University of the Balearic Islands